The 2013 BetVictor Welsh Open was a professional ranking snooker tournament that took place between 11 and 17 February 2013 at the Newport Centre in Newport, Wales. It was the seventh ranking event of the 2012/2013 season, and the first time that BetVictor sponsored the event.

At the tournament Pankaj Advani became the first Indian player to reach the quarter-final of a ranking event.

Ding Junhui was the defending champion, but he lost in the semi-finals 5–6 against Stuart Bingham.

Stephen Maguire won his fifth ranking title by defeating Bingham 9–8 in the final.

Prize fund
Prize money for the event this year was increased from £201,500 to £250,000, with the winner to receive £50,000 instead of £30,000. The breakdown of prize money for this year is shown below: 

Winner: £50,000
Runner-up: £30,000
Semi-finals: £16,000
Quarter-finals: £10,000
Last 16: £4,000
Last 32: £2,000
Last 64: £1,000

Non-televised highest break: £500
Televised highest break: £1,500
Total: £250,000

Main draw

Final

Qualifying
These matches were held between 6 and 9 February 2013 at the World Snooker Academy in Sheffield, England, and on 11 February 2013 at the Newport Centre in Newport, Wales.

Round 1

Round 2

Century breaks

Qualifying stage centuries

 145  Shaun Murphy
 140  Ricky Walden
 136  Alan McManus
 120  Craig Steadman
 113  Ken Doherty
 110  David Gilbert
 107  Jamie O'Neill

 107  Martin O'Donnell
 105  Michael White
 105  Steve Davis
 104  Sam Baird
 101  Gerard Greene
 100  Tom Ford
 100  Graeme Dott

Televised stage centuries

 144  Mark Selby
 137, 115, 107, 107, 104  Ding Junhui
 127, 120, 118, 108  Stuart Bingham
 121, 100  Pankaj Advani
 114, 110, 106, 100  Stephen Maguire
 114  Dominic Dale
 111  Joe Perry

 108  Robert Milkins
 105  Liang Wenbo
 101  John Higgins
 101  Tom Ford
 100  Anthony Hamilton
 100  Andrew Higginson
 100  Judd Trump

References

External links
 Betvictor Welsh Open – Pictures by World Snooker at Facebook

2013
Welsh Open
Open (snooker)
Welsh Open
Welsh Open snooker in Newport